Nikolaiika (Greek: Νικολαίικα) is a village in the municipal unit of Diakopto, Achaea, Greece. It is located near the Gulf of Corinth coast, 1 km east of Rizomylos, 5 km west of Diakopto and 7 km southeast of Aigio.  The Greek National Road 8A (Patras - Aigio - Corinth) passes south of the village.  In 2011, Nikolaiika had a population of 438.

Population

External links
 Nikoleika GTP Travel Pages
 Nikoleika in www.ediakopto.gr

See also

List of settlements in Achaea

References

Aigialeia
Diakopto
Populated places in Achaea